Ahmed Khalfan Muhail Al-Siyabi (born 16 July 1993), commonly known as Ahmed Al-Siyabi, is an Omani footballer who plays for Sur SC in Oman Professional League.

Club career statistics

International career
Ahmed He was selected for the national team for the first time in 2012. He made his first appearance for Oman on 25 December 2013 against Kuwait in the 2012 WAFF Championship. He has made an appearances in the 2012 WAFF Championship.

Honours

Club
With Sur
Oman Professional League Cup (1): 2007

References

External links
 
 
 
 

1993 births
Living people
People from Sur, Oman
Omani footballers
Oman international footballers
Association football forwards
Sur SC players
Oman Professional League players
Footballers at the 2014 Asian Games
Asian Games competitors for Oman